Epicoma contristis, the yellow-spotted epicoma, is a moth of the family Notodontidae first described by Jacob Hübner in 1823. It is known from Australia, including Tasmania, New South Wales and Victoria.

The forewings are dark brown speckled with silver flecks, with a row of orange spots along the termen, and a subterminal row of cream spots. There a dark ring with a yellow dot in the middle found in the centre of the forewing. The hindwings are dark brown with an orange border.

When the moth is threatened, it is inclined to lie down and look dead, with its wings lifted high and the abdomen curved under, displaying its orange anal tuft.

The larvae feed on the foliage of Casuarina, Eucalyptus, Leptospermum and Melaleuca species. Young larvae are gregarious and feed during the day. Later instars are solitary. They are dark grey and hairy, but the head capsule is white with red sides bordered with black. The body is speckled with yellow dots. Pupation takes place in a sparse elliptical cocoon amongst the leaves of the food plant.

References

Thaumetopoeinae